The Highland Clinical Research Facility (HCRF) supports clinical research in the Highlands of Scotland. It was opened in 2009, and is a purpose built facility housed within the Centre for Health Science, adjacent to Raigmore Hospital in Inverness.

References

External links
 Organisation Webpage

Health in Highland (council area)